Kilyakovka is a rural locality (a settlement) in Akhtubinskoye Rural Settlement, Sredneakhtubinsky District, Volgograd Oblast, Russia. The population was 280 as of 2010. There are 42 streets.

Geography 
Kilyakovka is located 10 km northwest of Srednyaya Akhtuba (the district's administrative centre) by road. Lesnaya Usadba is the nearest rural locality.

References 

Rural localities in Sredneakhtubinsky District